Adeseye "Seye" Akinola Ogunlewe (born 30 August 1991) is a Nigerian track and field sprinter who specialises in the 100 metres. He was a finalist in the 100 m and 4 × 100 m at the 2015 All-Africa Games. He won the 100 m at the Nigerian Championships in 2015 and 2016.

He was born in Lagos, Nigeria, the last child of Adeseye and Kemi Ogunlewe. He attended Atlantic Hall School, Epe. He initially started out playing football but was advised to sprint by his teacher. He moved to Ireland in 2008 and won the Irish Schools Championships in 2009 and 2010. Ireland and Nigeria were in a race to get him to represent them at the World Junior Championships in 2010. He however eventually missed the championships. He is a Law and Politics graduate of the University of Essex.

He placed second in the 60 m at the British Universities & Colleges Sport (BUCS) Indoor championships in 2011 behind Sven Knipphals. He remained the second-place finisher in 2012 and 2013 but eventually won the title in 2014. He was also the 2013 BUCS champion in the 100 m. In 2014, he was not successful in defending his title as he placed second behind Adam Gemili.

Ogunlewe represented his country at the 2014 Commonwealth Games, running in the 200 m. He finished 4th in his heat and did not progress to the semifinals. He ran the anchor leg for Nigeria in the 4 × 100 m final at the 2015 Brazzaville African Games. The team finished second but were eventually disqualified for a faulty baton change. He also reached the final in the individual 100 m.

At the 2016 Nigerian Championships, he successfully defended his national title. He won the 100 m in a personal best of 10.12 s ahead of Divine Oduduru and Ogho-oghene Egwero, and thereby qualified for the Rio Olympic Games. After the championships, he used social media to lament the insufficient support of athletes by Nigerian organisations. In 2019 he improved on his best time by recording a new personal record of 10.11.

References

External links 
 
 All-Athletics profile
 Adeseye Ogunlewe Profile at Power of 10
 Seye Ogunlewe on Twitter

Living people
1991 births
Sportspeople from Lagos
Nigerian male sprinters
Nigerian expatriates in England
Olympic athletes of Nigeria
Athletes (track and field) at the 2016 Summer Olympics
Commonwealth Games competitors for Nigeria
Athletes (track and field) at the 2014 Commonwealth Games
Athletes (track and field) at the 2018 Commonwealth Games
Alumni of the University of Essex
Athletes (track and field) at the 2015 African Games
Athletes (track and field) at the 2019 African Games
African Games medalists in athletics (track and field)
African Games silver medalists for Nigeria
20th-century Nigerian people
21st-century Nigerian people